Joshua Mathew Katzen (born 7 June 1992 in Cape Town, South Africa) is a South African rugby union player, who most recently played with . His regular position is flanker or number eight.

Career

Katzen played rugby for Wynberg Boys' High School, but was not selected to represent his provincial union  at any youth tournaments. After high school, however, he joined the Western Province Rugby Institute. He made four appearances during the regular season of the competition, helping his side to finish in third spot on the log to earn a semi-final spot. He started their 19–18 win over the s in the semi-final and also started the final, where he could not prevent his side losing 13–22 to the s. He also won the award for Western Province's Most Promising Under-21 player at their 2012 end-of-season awards ceremony.

Overall, his team had a disappointing season, finishing second-bottom in the competition.

He was named the captain of the Western Province U21 side that played in the 2013 Under-21 Provincial Championship and started nine of their fourteen matches. He scored tries against ,  and  during the regular season, guiding his side to eleven wins in twelve matches. He started in an epic semi-final match, with Western Province U21 eventually winning the match 44–31 after extra time. He also started the final against  and scored two tries in a man-of-the-match performance as his side ran out 30–23 winners to be crowned 2013 champions.

Katzen missed a few fixtures due to his involvement with the senior team.

However, he lasted just 12 minutes of that match before sustaining a serious knee injury that ruled him out for over a year. He returned from the knee injury to play for Western Province in a friendly match against the  prior to the 2015 Currie Cup Premier Division, but once again sustained a serious injury, on this occasion requiring an operating on both his shoulders, which ruled him out for the remainder of 2015.

References

South African rugby union players
Living people
1992 births
Rugby union players from Cape Town
Rugby union flankers
Rugby union number eights
Western Province (rugby union) players
Alumni of Wynberg Boys' High School